The Journal of Nursing Scholarship is a bimonthly peer-reviewed nursing journal published by Wiley. It covers nursing research and is the official journal of Sigma Theta Tau International. The editor-in-chief is Susan Gennaro (Boston College). The journal was originally titled Image when first published starting in 1967, then continued as Image: The Journal of Nursing Scholarship from 1984 until 1999.

Abstracting and indexing
The journal is abstracted and indexed in:
Academic ASAP
EBSCO databases
ProQuest databases
Current Contents/Social & Behavioral Sciences
InfoTrac
MEDLINE/PubMed
PsycINFO
Science Citation Index Expanded
Scopus
Social Sciences Citation Index

According to the Journal Citation Reports, the journal has a 2020 impact factor of 3.176.

References

External links

Quarterly journals
General nursing journals
English-language journals
Publications established in 1967
Wiley (publisher) academic journals